Cletodidae is a family of copepods belonging to the order Harpacticoida.

Genera

Genera:
 Acrenhydrosoma Lang, 1944
 Australonannopus Hamond, 1974
 Barbaracletodes Huys, 2009

References

Copepods